Novokhopyorsk is a town and the administrative center of Novokhopyorsky District in Voronezh Oblast, Russia, located on the right bank of the Khopyor River,  southeast of Voronezh, the administrative center of the oblast. Population:

History

It was granted town status in 1779.

Administrative and municipal status
Within the framework of administrative divisions, Novokhopyorsk serves as the administrative center of Novokhopyorsky District. As an administrative division, it is, together with the work settlement of Novokhopyorsky and sixteen rural localities in Novokhopyorsky District, is incorporated within Novokhopyorsky District as Novokhopyorsk Urban Settlement. As a municipal division, this administrative unit also has urban settlement status and is a part of Novokhopyorsky Municipal District.

References

Notes

Sources

Cities and towns in Voronezh Oblast
Populated places in Novokhopyorsky District
Novokhopyorsky Uyezd